Mario Borgiotti was born in 1906 to a working-class family in Livorno, Italy

In 1921 knows the painters of Gruppo Labronico and Ulvi Liegi.

After studying violin, he devoted himself to the trade in works of art from 1922; for years, I decided for the knowledge of the art world from Leghorn in fact are just that time acquainted with Gino Romiti, Umberto Vittorini.

In 1925, he organized an exhibition of contemporary painting at Pisa with the presence of a large group of painters labronici.

His first exhibition of 19th century art took place in Pisa in 1927.

In 1928, he promoted a Last at "Bottega d'Arte Calligani" exhibition-sale of works by Macchiaioli.

In the 1930 in Viareggio a collective exhibition of painters labronici and of Italian artists of the nineteenth century.

He began his apprenticeship as a painter with master Giovanni March in the same year, and in 1934 his work was first exhibited in group show at the seventh provincial exhibition of Livorno.

Intense his work as a portraitist he sees immortalised in his paintings Pietro Mascagni, Giovanni Bartolena, Ulvi Liegi and Piero Vaccari.

In 1938, he moved to Florence and organized an exhibition of 19th-century painting at the Gallery Florence.

In 1946, the "art gallery" of Livorno exhibited 46 of his works of his artistic repertoire.

In 1947, he joined the Gruppo Labronico. He became president of the group in 1967.

In 1953 with Nedo Luschi and Renzo Casali the prize painting contest at the Rotonda of Ardenza.

In 1955, Borgiotti moved to Milan and continued his artistic career with the study of SagratiScotti via Manzoni.

He organized the "Salem" with Renato Natali, Bruno Miniati and Aldo Santini in Livorno in 1961.

In 1963, he was one of the curators of an exhibition of artists macchiaioli to "artistic Center Skyscraper" directed by father Guidubaldi of Livorno; exhibition will be moving to London and from here in the United States in major American museums.

The main exhibitions 

 1945, meadow, "dancers".
 1946, Livorno, 1946 "art gallery".
 1953, Milan, "Sianesi Gallery".
 1953, Florence, "Galleria d'Arte Firenze".
 1954, Naples "Medea".
 1954, Genoa, "Andrew art gallery".
 1955, Milan, Galleria Gussoni ".
 1966, Milan, Galleria Gussoni ".
 1967. Brescia, Galleria San Michele ".
 1969, Milan, "Ambrose art gallery".
 1970, Brescia, Galleria San Michele ".
 1970, Milan, "Ambrose art gallery".
 1971, Legnano, "Studio Art".
 1973, Cortina d'Ampezzo, "Gallery Le Tofane"
 1979, nerves, "art gallery the terminus".
 1982, Bologna, homage to Mario Borgiotti, "Galleria La Meridiana".
 1990, Livorno, The landscape painting of Borgiotti, "Bottega d'Arte".

Bibliography 

 EDWARD HILLYER GIGLIOLI, Mario Borgiotti painter, Gallery "Firenze" Florence, Italy 1944 (GIGLIOLI, 1944) MARIO BORGIOTTI, my sea, introduction by Anna Franchi, editions "S.T.E.T.", Florence 1948
 MARIO BORGIOTTI, As I see Florence. Thirty paintings reproduced in quattricomiawith "Prelude to Florence" Florence Arnaud, Editions of Giovanni Papini, 1953
 Mario Borgiotti, presentation by Ardengo Soffici, exhibition catalogue (21-30 April, Milan, Galleria Gussoni 1955), Arnaud, Florence 1955 (FLUFFY, 1955)
 ORIO VERGANI, Mario Borgiotti, Aldo Martello Editore, Milan 1959 (VALI, 1959)
 ALDO SANTINI, Mario Borgiotti, Alfieri & Lacroix, Milano 1966 (SANTINI, 1966)
 MARIO BORGIOTTI, poetry and colour of Milan, Edizioni d'Arte Sant'Ambrogio, Milan 1970
 MARIO BORGIOTTI, pictorial face of Pavia, editions Manzoni art gallery, Milan 1973
 Dialogue with an artist. Mario Borgiotti. A life for the Macchiaioli. Notes, memoranda and testimonies collected and illustrated by Paul Nicholls, Paul Nicholls, Milano 1976 (dialogue with an artist. 1976)
 MARIO BORGIOTTI, consistency and modern painters labronici, Giunti Martello, Firenze 1979 (BORGIOTTI, 1979)

References

External links 
 https://books.google.it/books?id=RlpxkKr63qIC&pg=PA46&lpg=PA46&dq=mario+borgiotti&source=bl&ots=NxhtBHsumw&sig=vK3AOMAe9RY_6T-hOtPMpZkhHtA&hl=it&sa=X&ved=0ahUKEwjA55aa6IzNAhXNSxoKHYHqCt04ChDoAQhGMAs#v=onepage&q=mario%20borgiotti&f=false
 http://www.arcadja.com/auctions/it/borgiotti_mario/prezzi-opere/3272/
 https://books.google.it/books?id=afW7G_d7BtQC&pg=PA80&lpg=PA80&dq=mario+borgiotti&source=bl&ots=oH2XuGOULi&sig=ooFVNWxCj5ogw0g0pd2Y36Gh0PI&hl=it&sa=X&ved=0ahUKEwjA55aa6IzNAhXNSxoKHYHqCt04ChDoAQhJMAw#v=onepage&q=mario%20borgiotti&f=false
 uuid = AawFm4uD
 id = 396
 http://www.pananti.com/it/asta-0094/borgiotti-mario-il-pittore-ghelarducci.asp
 Biografia Mario Borgiotti

Italian artists
People from Livorno
1906 births
1977 deaths
Gruppo Labronico